Alshaya Group (also called the M.H. Alshaya Co.) is a multinational retail franchise operator headquartered in Kuwait. It operates 90 consumer retail brands across the Middle East and North Africa, Russia, Turkey, and Europe. In addition to its retail operations, the Alshaya Group has holdings in real estate, construction, hotels, automotive and general trading, largely centred in the Middle East.

History
In 1890, M.H. Alshaya Co. was founded in Kuwait in as a shipping company, initially trading with British India. In 1965, the company diversified by opening a Sheraton hotel in Kuwait City, the first Sheraton outside North America. In 1983, Alshaya expanded its franchising business when it acquired the Kuwait franchise rights for UK retailer Mothercare. H&M, In 1999, Alshaya entered the food retail sector with a partnership with Starbucks. Alshaya's acquisition of the Topshop franchise for Turkey in 2002 was its first expansion outside the Middle East. The company moved into Russia in 2005 with the acquisition of the Russian franchise rights for Mothercare. In 2006, Alshaya launched international clothing retailer H&M in the Middle East, followed by a number of US-headquartered brands looking to expand into the Middle East: Dean and Deluca (2008), P. F. Chang's, Pinkberry and Payless ShoeSource (all 2009). In 2010, Alshaya added American Eagle, Pottery Barn and Pottery Barn Kids to its portfolio. It also secured franchise rights for the first international outlets of Texas Roadhouse, and opened its first Victoria's Secret Beauty and Accessories stores in the Middle East in Bahrain and Kuwait. In June 2012, the first The Cheesecake Factory restaurant outside North America opened in the UAE. In November 2012, further brands were added to Alshaya's portfolio: Harvey Nichols Kuwait, Victoria's Secret, Jack Wills, COS, West Elm and Williams-Sonoma.

In December 2012, Alshaya opened the Alshaya Retail Academy in Riyadh, Saudi Arabia, providing retail training and employment on graduation for young Saudi women. In February 2013 Alshaya opened up the 160th location of The Cheesecake Factory in The Avenues (Kuwait). In April 2014, Alshaya announced it would open two more Alshaya Retail Academies in Saudi Arabia, in Jeddah and Dammam. Alshaya moved into the Leisure and Entertainment sector in June 2013 with the opening of KidZania Kuwait, at The Avenues (Kuwait). Muji opened at The Avenues in the same year. Katsuya by Philippe Starck launched in Kuwait and the UAE, and in December 2013, more Alshaya restaurant brands were introduced to Saudi Arabia—The Cheesecake Factory, Texas Roadhouse, Shake Shack, P. F. Chang's and PizzaExpress. 2015 saw the Middle East debut of fast-food chicken restaurant Raising Cane's in Kuwait. In 2016, Alshaya launched its loyalty programme, Privileges Club, in Kuwait, with plans to roll the programme out across its GCC markets. Lebanese restaurant Babel opened its first outlet outside Lebanon, in Kuwait. In 2017, several new brands made their Middle Eastern debut, including Bouchon Bakery; Charlotte Tilbury; NYX Cosmetics; 400 Gradi; and & Other Stories. The company also opened the Four Seasons Hotel Kuwait at Burj Alshaya in downtown Kuwait City. Burj Alshaya features the 22-story Four Seasons in the Eastern Tower and houses the corporate headquarters of the company in the 43-story Western Tower. Also making their regional debut at Kuwait's new Avenues Phase IV extension were Swedish fashion brand Monki, Blaze Pizza and new entertainment concept TekZone.
Luxury Home Fragrance brand Dr. Vranjes Firenze  made its first Middle East foray later that year. In January 2019, Alshaya opened its own brand Amiti Noura, a restaurant that offers traditional Kuwaiti cuisine at Kuwait's largest shopping mall, The Avenues followed by the opening of contemporary New York city-based fashion brand alice + olivia by Stacey Bendet, in April.

Later that year, Alshaya Group partnered with Hilton to open 70 Hampton by Hilton Hotels in nine countries the Middle East, North Africa, Turkey and Russia. In December 2019, Alshaya signed an agreement with Equinox Group to bring three fitness brands to the region: Equinox Fitness Clubs, SoulCycle and Blink Fitness, with initial opening plans focused on Dubai in late 2020.  They also announced plans to bring the Canopy by Hilton hotel brand to Kuwait.

In early 2020, Alshaya introduced café and bakery Princi to Kuwait.

In March 2022 Alshaya Group temporarily closed all stores in Russia (Starbucks, Mothercare, The Body Shop, Victoria's Secret), which might be connected to the international sanctions imposed against Russia because of the war in Ukraine.

Operations
Some of the brands managed and operated by Alshaya Group include Raising Canes, Mothercare, American Eagle, Debenhams, Harvey Nichols Kuwait, Payless ShoeSource, Topshop, Starbucks, Shake Shack, The Cheesecake Factory, Pinkberry, P. F. Chang's, Le Pain Quotidien, Katsuya by Philippe Starck, The Body Shop, Victoria's Secret, Boots pharmacy, Vision Express, Pottery Barn, Williams Sonoma, and KidZania Kuwait. Its hotel division owns the Sheraton Hotel in Kuwait and the Oberoi Hotel in Medina, Saudi Arabia.

Some Presidents of their are divisions are 

 Saleh Al Shaya - President H&M

References

Companies based in Kuwait City
Retail companies of Kuwait